This article contains the results of the Republic of Ireland women's national football team between 2010 and 2019.

2010

2011

2012

2013

2014

2015

2016

2017

2018

Notes

References

2010-19
2010 in Republic of Ireland women's association football
2011–12 in Republic of Ireland women's association football
2012–13 in Republic of Ireland women's association football
2013–14 in Republic of Ireland women's association football
2014–15 in Republic of Ireland women's association football
2015–16 in Republic of Ireland women's association football
2016–17 in Republic of Ireland women's association football